Moiola is a comune (municipality) in the Province of Cuneo in the Italian region Piedmont, located about  southwest of Turin and about  southwest of Cuneo.

Moiola borders the following municipalities: Borgo San Dalmazzo, Demonte, Gaiola, Valdieri, and Valloriate.

From 1928 to 1946 it was merged with Gaiola.

References

Cities and towns in Piedmont

be:Маёла